Misto Esporte Clube, commonly known as Misto, is a Brazilian football team based in Três Lagoas, Mato Grosso do Sul state. They competed in the Copa do Brasil once.

History
The club was founded on 1 May 1987.They competed in the Copa do Brasil in 2009, defeating Campinense in the First Round, but they were eliminated by Corinthians in the Second Round of the cup.

Stadium
Misto Esporte Clube play their home games at Estádio Benedito Soares Mota, nicknamed Madrugadão. The stadium has a maximum capacity of 6,000 people.

References

Association football clubs established in 1992
Football clubs in Mato Grosso do Sul
1992 establishments in Brazil